The 2022–23 NLEX Road Warriors season is the eighth season of the franchise in the Philippine Basketball Association (PBA).

Key dates
May 15: The PBA Season 47 draft was held at the Robinsons Place Manila in Manila.

Draft picks

Roster

Philippine Cup

Eliminations

Standings

Game log

|-bgcolor=ccffcc
| 1
| June 8
| Terrafirma
| W 105–102
| Kevin Alas (24)
| Justin Chua (10)
| Alas, Quiñahan (6)
| Smart Araneta Coliseum
| 1–0
|-bgcolor=ffcccc
| 2
| June 10
| San Miguel
| L 92–100
| Don Trollano (21)
| Quiñahan, Rosales (7)
| Kevin Alas (6)
| Ynares Center
| 1–1
|-bgcolor=ccffcc
| 3
| June 16
| TNT
| W 90–89
| Calvin Oftana (20)
| Kevin Alas (7)
| Kevin Alas (6)
| Ynares Center
| 2–1
|-bgcolor=ffcccc
| 4
| June 22
| Barangay Ginebra
| L 75–83
| Kevin Alas (16)
| Calvin Oftana (12)
| J. R. Quiñahan (6)
| SM Mall of Asia Arena
| 2–2
|-bgcolor=ccffcc
| 5
| June 25
| Meralco
| W 90–75
| Don Trollano (19)
| Calvin Oftana (13)
| Kevin Alas (5)
| Ynares Center
| 3–2
|-bgcolor=ccffcc
| 6
| June 30
| Phoenix
| W 114–108 (OT)
| Calvin Oftana (22)
| Calvin Oftana (10)
| Alas, Oftana (7)
| Smart Araneta Coliseum
| 4–2

|-bgcolor=ffcccc
| 7
| July 2
| Magnolia
| L 73–87
| J. R. Quiñahan (17)
| Justin Chua (9)
| Alas, Chua, Oftana, Trollano (2)
| Smart Araneta Coliseum
| 4–3
|-bgcolor=ffcccc
| 8
| July 7
| Converge
| L 108–112
| Kris Rosales (29)
| Alas, Oftana (8)
| Kevin Alas (7)
| Smart Araneta Coliseum
| 4–4
|-bgcolor=ffcccc
| 9
| July 9
| Rain or Shine
| L 86–96
| Don Trollano (20)
| Don Trollano (11)
| Kevin Alas (7)
| Smart Araneta Coliseum
| 4–5
|-bgcolor=ccffcc
| 10
| July 15
| Blackwater
| W 98–68
| Don Trollano (16)
| Justin Chua (9)
| Kris Rosales (4)
| Ynares Center
| 5–5
|-bgcolor=ccffcc
| 11
| July 22
| NorthPort
| W 109–95
| Raul Soyud (19)
| Justin Chua (9)
| Matt Nieto (8)
| Smart Araneta Coliseum
| 6–5

Playoffs

Bracket

Game log

|-bgcolor=ffcccc
| 1
| July 24
| Magnolia
| L 89–98
| Anthony Semerad (19)
| Anthony Semerad (6)
| Nieto, Oftana, Paniamogan, Trollano (4)
| Smart Araneta Coliseum
| 0–1
|-bgcolor=ccffcc
| 2
| July 29
| Magnolia
| W 90–77
| Kevin Alas (30)
| Don Trollano (12)
| Alas, Trollano (4)
| Filoil EcoOil Centre
| 1–1
|-bgcolor=ffcccc
| 3
| July 31
| Magnolia
| L 106–112 (OT)
| Calvin Oftana (32)
| Kevin Alas (11)
| Alas, Trollano (5)
| SM Mall of Asia Arena
| 1–2

Commissioner's Cup

Eliminations

Standings

Game log

|-bgcolor=ccffcc
| 1
| September 23, 2022
| Rain or Shine
| W 96–90
| Earl Clark (26)
| Earl Clark (14)
| Matt Nieto (5)
| PhilSports Arena
| 1–0
|-bgcolor=ccffcc
| 2
| September 30, 2022
| Blackwater
| W 105–102
| Earl Clark (38)
| Earl Clark (25)
| Earl Clark (4)
| Smart Araneta Coliseum
| 2–0

|-bgcolor=ffcccc
| 3
| October 8, 2022
| Phoenix
| L 97–111
| Earl Clark (36)
| Earl Clark (20)
| Earl Clark (8)
| PhilSports Arena
| 2–1
|-bgcolor=ffcccc
| 4
| October 12, 2022
| Magnolia
| L 97–111
| Alas, Chua (16)
| Earl Clark (10)
| Matt Nieto (6)
| Smart Araneta Coliseum
| 2–2
|-bgcolor=ccffcc
| 5
| October 19, 2022
| TNT
| W 110–101
| Earl Clark (45)
| Earl Clark (16)
| Alas, Nieto (3)
| PhilSports Arena
| 3–2
|-bgcolor=ffcccc
| 6
| October 23, 2022
| San Miguel
| L 116–124
| Earl Clark (40)
| Earl Clark (25)
| Matt Nieto (8)
| SM Mall of Asia Arena12,087
| 3–3

|-bgcolor=ffcccc
| 7
| November 5, 2022
| Converge
| L 84–108
| Brandon Ganuelas-Rosser (24)
| Clark, Ganuelas-Rosser (9)
| Matt Nieto (7)
| Ynares Center
| 3–4
|-bgcolor=ffcccc
| 8
| November 9, 2022
| NorthPort
| L 94–107
| Earl Clark (29)
| Earl Clark (15)
| Earl Clark (6)
| Smart Araneta Coliseum
| 3–5
|-bgcolor=ffcccc
| 9
| November 13, 2022
| Bay Area
| L 98–118
| Earl Clark (17)
| Earl Clark (11)
| Earl Clark (5)
| Smart Araneta Coliseum
| 3–6
|-bgcolor=ffcccc
| 10
| November 18, 2022
| Terrafirma
| L 114–124 (OT)
| Earl Clark (45)
| Earl Clark (18)
| Matt Nieto (9)
| Smart Araneta Coliseum
| 3–7
|-bgcolor=ccffcc
| 11
| November 25, 2022
| Barangay Ginebra
| W 120–117 (OT)
| Earl Clark (37)
| Earl Clark (17)
| Kevin Alas (9)
| PhilSports Arena
| 4–7
|-bgcolor=ccffcc
| 12
| November 30, 2022
| Meralco
| W 92–81
| Earl Clark (40)
| Earl Clark (11)
| Alas, Rosales, Varilla (3)
| PhilSports Arena
| 5–7

Playoffs

Bracket

Game log

|-bgcolor=ffcccc
| 1
| December 4, 2022
| Rain or Shine
| L 100–110
| Earl Clark (37)
| Earl Clark (16)
| Earl Clark (5)
| PhilSports Arena
| 0–1

Governors' Cup

Eliminations

Standings

Game log

|-bgcolor=ccffcc
| 1
| January 25
| Blackwater
| W 124–102
| Jonathon Simmons (32)
| Jonathon Simmons (9)
| Jonathon Simmons (7)
| Smart Araneta Coliseum
| 1–0
|-bgcolor=ccffcc
| 2
| January 28
| NorthPort
| W 121–112 
| Jonathon Simmons (33) 
| Anthony, Semerad, Simmons (8)
| Kevin Alas (6)
| Ynares Center
| 2–0

|-bgcolor=ccffcc
| 3
| February 1
| TNT
| W 110–108
| Jonathon Simmons (45)
| Jonathon Simmons (12)
| Jonathon Simmons (3)
| PhilSports Arena
| 3–0
|-bgcolor=ccffcc
| 4
| February 4
| Phoenix
| W 98–94
| Jonathon Simmons (38)
| Kevin Alas (8)
| Jonathon Simmons (5)
| Ynares Center
| 4–0
|-bgcolor=ffcccc
| 5
| February 8
| Barangay Ginebra
| L 111–114
| Wayne Selden Jr. (43)
| Brandon Ganuelas-Rosser (11)
| Wayne Selden Jr. (7)
| Smart Araneta Coliseum
| 4–1
|-bgcolor=ffcccc
| 6
| February 16
| Magnolia
| L 103–119
| Wayne Selden Jr. (25)
| Brandon Ganuelas-Rosser (7)
| Wayne Selden Jr. (9)
| Smart Araneta Coliseum
| 4–2
|-bgcolor=ccffcc
| 7
| February 18
| Converge
| W 116–112
| Wayne Selden Jr. (35)
| Ganuelas-Rosser, Selden Jr. (7)
| Wayne Selden Jr. (6)
| Smart Araneta Coliseum
| 5–2
|-bgcolor=ffcccc
| 8
| February 23
| Meralco
| L 98–114
| Wayne Selden Jr. (29)
| Wayne Selden Jr. (8) 
| Wayne Selden Jr. (7)
| PhilSports Arena
| 5–3
|-bgcolor=ccffcc
| 9
| February 25
| Rain or Shine
| W 110–99
| Kevin Alas (28)
| Wayne Selden Jr. (10) 
| Matt Nieto (5)
| Smart Araneta Coliseum
| 6–3

|-bgcolor=ccffcc
| 10
| March 2
| Terrafirma
| W 142–125
| Don Trollano (44)
| Brandon Ganuelas-Rosser (12)
| Nieto, Selden Jr. (8)
| Smart Araneta Coliseum
| 7–3
|- align="center"
|colspan="9" bgcolor="#bbcaff"|All-Star Break
|-bgcolor=ffcccc
| 11
| March 15
| San Miguel
| L 106–120
| Wayne Selden Jr. (32)
| Brandon Ganuelas-Rosser (15)
| Kevin Alas (7)
| PhilSports Arena
| 7–4

Playoffs

Bracket

Game log

|-bgcolor=ffcccc
| 1
| March 19
| Barangay Ginebra
| L 93–127
| Sean Anthony (16)
| Brandon Ganuelas-Rosser (10)
| Kris Rosales (6)
| Smart Araneta Coliseum
| 0–1

Transactions

Free agency

Signings

Trades

Pre-season

Mid-season

Recruited imports

References

NLEX Road Warriors seasons
NLEX Road Warriors